Hypoleria is a genus of clearwing (ithomiine) butterflies, named by Frederick DuCane Godman and Osbert Salvin in 1879. They are in the brush-footed butterfly family, Nymphalidae.

Species
Arranged alphabetically:
Hypoleria adasa (Hewitson, [1855])
Hypoleria alema (Hewitson, [1857])
Hypoleria aureliana (Bates, 1862)
Hypoleria jaruensis d'Almeida, 1951
Hypoleria lavinia (Hewitson, [1855])
Hypoleria ocalea (Doubleday & Hewitson, 1847)
Hypoleria sarepta (Hewitson, [1852])
Hypoleria xenophis Haensch, 1909

References

Ithomiini
Nymphalidae of South America
Nymphalidae genera
Taxa named by Frederick DuCane Godman
Taxa named by Osbert Salvin